Aaron Christopher Barnes (born 14 October 1996) is an English professional footballer who plays as a full-back for Welling United.

Barnes is a product of the Arsenal Academy, where he played from under-11 level until 2013, when he joined Charlton Athletic to continue his development. He made his professional debut at Charlton and experienced a brief loan away in January 2018 at Torquay United. He then made a permanent switch to Colchester United before immediately rejoining Torquay on loan for the rest of the 2017–18 season. He left Colchester at the end of his contract in summer 2019.

Career

Arsenal
Barnes was born in the London Borough of Croydon but later grew up in Walderslade, Kent and attended Oakwood Park Grammar School in Maidstone. He started his career in the youth team of Arsenal, signing for them at the age of ten in 2006 after he was spotted by scouts whilst representing Kent in a tournament in Denmark. He progressed through the youth system but failed to earn a scholarship and was released in 2013 aged sixteen.

Charlton Athletic
Barnes signed a scholarship with Charlton Athletic in March 2013, and after a year at the club signed his first professional contract in December 2014. For the next two years he featured predominantly in the under-18 and under-23 academy teams and was rewarded with a new one-year contract in May 2016. He made the progression into the first team during the 2016–17 season and signed a further one-year contract extension in March 2017. He made his professional debut in the final game of the season in April 2017, appearing as a late substitute for Chris Solly in the 3–0 victory over Swindon Town.

On 12 January 2018, Barnes signed for National League side Torquay United in a one-month loan deal. He made his club debut on 27 January in a 1–1 draw at Macclesfield Town.

Colchester United
On 31 January 2018, Barnes signed for League Two club Colchester United. He was immediately loaned back to Torquay United for the remainder of the season. He scored his first competitive goal on 10 February in Torquay's 2–1 win at Maidenhead United.

On 4 September 2018, Barnes made his Colchester United debut starting in their 2–0 defeat by Southampton Under-21s in the EFL Trophy.

On 14 May 2019, it was announced Barnes was to leave Colchester United at the end of his contract.

Dulwich Hamlet
On 30 July 2019, Barnes signed for Dulwich Hamlet for the 2019/20 season.

Welling United
Following two curtailed seasons with Dulwich due to COVID-19, he signed for fellow National League South side Welling United for the 2021–22 season.

For the 2020/21 season, Barnes is sponsored by Deefer, a local bulldog.

Career statistics

References

External links

1996 births
Living people
Footballers from Croydon
English footballers
Black British sportsmen
Association football fullbacks
Association football defenders
Arsenal F.C. players
Charlton Athletic F.C. players
Torquay United F.C. players
Colchester United F.C. players
Dulwich Hamlet F.C. players
Welling United F.C. players
English Football League players
National League (English football) players